Shane Christensen (born 20 March 1970) is a former professional rugby league footballer who played in the 1990s.

Playing career
An Ingham product, Christensen was signed by the Newcastle Knights for their inaugural season in 1988. In Round 2 of the 1990 NSWRL season, Christensen made his first grade debut in Newcastle's 12–28 loss to the Manly Sea Eagles. During his time with the Knights, Christensen played just three games, spending the majority of his time in the under-21 and reserve grade competitions.

In 1992, Christensen returned to Ingham to play for Herbert River. In 1993 and 1994, he represented the Queensland Residents team on their tours of Papua New Guinea and South Africa. In 1994, he represented the Australian Residents against the New Zealand Residents.

In 1995, Christensen joined the newly-established North Queensland Cowboys, playing in their inaugural game against the Sydney Bulldogs. Originally named to start at hooker, he came off the bench after Dean Schifilliti passed a late fitness test. After 10 games with the Cowboys, he left the club at the end of the season. In 1996, he played one more season in Ingham before retiring.

Post-playing career
After retiring, Christensen settled in Townsville, where he taught at Shalom Christian College and coached Souths Townsville.

References

1970 births
Living people
Australian rugby league players
North Queensland Cowboys players
Newcastle Knights players
Rugby league hookers
Rugby league players from Queensland